Gospodin Franjo is a novel by Slovenian author Fran Maselj (pen name: Podlimbarski). It was first published in 1913. The author incorporates an overt message in support of Yugoslav union by having his protagonist sympathize with Slovenian culture and come to hate the boorish occupiers in Austrian-occupied Bosnia.

See also
List of Slovenian novels

References

Slovenian novels
1913 novels